Ossineke may refer to the following places in Alpena County in the U.S. state of Michigan:

 Ossineke, Michigan, an unincorporated community in Sanborn Township
 Ossineke Township, Michigan